Teisten is an islet in Menkeøyane, part of Thousand Islands, a Norwegian island group south of Edgeøya.

References 

 Norwegian Polar Institute Place Names of Svalbard Database

Islands of Svalbard